Tiny Toon Adventures: Buster and the Beanstalk is the only Tiny Toon Adventures-related video game released for MS-DOS and various other systems. It was developed and published by Terraglyph Interactive Studios in 1996.  There is a PlayStation game called Tiny Toon Adventures: The Great Beanstalk that is very similar.

Gameplay
Buster and the Beanstalk is a retelling of the Jack and the Beanstalk story starring Tiny Toon Adventures characters. The object of the game is to help two stars from the show, Buster Bunny and Plucky Duck, get into the Giant's castle. This is done by finding pieces of the keys needed, which is found by using hints given over a loudspeaker (by Babs Bunny). Players point and click on objects found in each scene of the game, using those hints. If they find the right object told in the hint, they find a piece of the key they need.

There are three total keys to build on easy mode, but changing it to hard can give the player a longer adventure.  But if a player gets stuck, the beautiful, magical fairy princess (aka Babs Bunny) gives the heroes at the beginning of the game a magical cell phone that they can use to get unstuck. Elmyra Duff takes the role of a magical witch that can capture Buster and Plucky, hindering their quest for a bit.

1996 video games
DOS games
Classic Mac OS games
Point-and-click adventure games
Video games based on Tiny Toon Adventures
Video games developed in the United States
Windows games